The arrow of time is a concept concerning the "one-way direction" or "asymmetry" of time.

Arrow of time may also refer to:

Entropy (arrow of time)
"Arrow of Time" (Numbers), an episode of Numb3rs
Arrow of Time/The Cycle of Time, an album by Kuckuck Schallplatten

See also
Time's arrow (disambiguation)